Consort Yang (984–1036), was an imperial consort of Emperor Zhenzong and the de facto foster mother of Emperor Renzong of Song. She was given the title Empress Dowager in later years.

Yang became a concubine of Emperor Zhenzong but, though well liked by the emperor, she did not qualify for a higher rank than shufei during his reign.

When the heir to the throne, the future Emperor Renzong of Song, was born to the Consort Li in 1010, Yang supported Empress Liu's claim to be his mother, while Yang was given the actual responsibility for his upbringing. She was described as submissive and loyal to Empress Liu, and gentle and tender towards her fosterling Renzong.

Upon Emperor Zhenzong's death in 1022 Yang was promoted to the rank of grand consort or taifei in his will. Empress Liu took the role of regent during the minority of Emperor Renzong, but kept it until her own death in 1033, even after he had reached legal majority. Upon her death Empress Liu proclaimed Consort Yang Empress Dowager and declared that she was now to be regent for the emperor. Though Emperor Renzong refused to accept this arrangement he did give her the rank of Empress Dowager, but without political power.

References
 Lily Xiao Hong Lee, Sue Wiles: Biographical Dictionary of Chinese Women, Volume II: Tang Through Ming 618 - 1644

11th-century Chinese people
Song dynasty imperial consorts
Song dynasty empresses dowager